A kabuki brush (sometimes called mushroom brush) is a makeup brush with dense to fluffy bristles and most recognizably has a short handle. The brush head is most often rounded, though it can also be flat. Traditionally, the bristles are made of natural materials like animal hair (e.g., goat or horse hair), but most brushes available now on the market have synthetic bristles.

Origin
The brush is named after kabuki, a traditional type of Japanese drama theater, where actors wear heavy makeup often painted in dramatic styles to emphasizes the nature of the characters. The kabuki brush is used to apply the white rice powder uniformly on the entire face.

Modern usage
Usually, a kabuki brush is used to apply loose powdered make-up on large surfaces of the face (e.g., foundation, face powder, blush). Because of its design, the brush blends powdered makeup evenly on the skin and creates very natural looking coverage.

Cosmetics
Skin care
Kabuki